Arhopala arvina, the purple-brown tailless oakblue, is a species of butterfly belonging to the lycaenid family. It was described by William Chapman Hewitson in 1869. It is found in  Southeast Asia (Java, Assam, Burma, Mergui, Thailand, Peninsular Malaya, Sumatra and Borneo).

Subspecies
Arhopala arvina arvina (Java)
Arhopala arvina ardea (Evans, 1932) (Assam)
Arhopala arvina aboe de Nicéville, 1895 (southern Burma, Mergui, southern Thailand)
Arhopala arvina adalitas Corbet, 1941 (Peninsular Malaysia, Sumatra, Borneo)

References

Arhopala
Butterflies described in 1869
Butterflies of Asia
Taxa named by William Chapman Hewitson